The Superb Matchmakers (媒人帮) is a telemovie that was produced by Malaysian channel, ntv7 in conjunction with 2011 Lunar New Year. ntv7 revealed this mega production on their Facebook fan page on 19 October 2010. It will air on the first day of 2011 Chinese New Year at 10:00pm slot. Behind the scene of the production of this telemovie aired on 10 January 2011, Monday at 6:00pm.

Plot
"The Super Match-Makers" talks about the love stories of 6 destined match-makers since young who could only find true love upon accomplishment of an ultimate match-making mission before 30 or they would have to stay single forever.

Cast
William San 辛伟廉
Cai Peixuan蔡佩璇
Yeo Yann Yann 杨雁雁
Melvin Sia 谢佳见
Leslie Chai 蔡可立
Miao Miao 苗苗
Kah Chee 程珈琪
Owen Yap 叶剑峰
Monday 江伟翰
Mayjune Tan 陈美君
Hishiko Woo 吴佩其
Frederick Lee 李洺中
Kyo Chen 庄仲维
Aenie Wong 王淑君

Theme Song
《圆圆满满》(Festive) by casts, available on ntv7 2011 Chinese New Year album.

External links
ntv7 60 seconds trailer
Facebook Official Fan page

Awards and nominations

Golden Awards 2012
 Won: Best Festival Programme

References

Chinese-language drama television series in Malaysia
2011 Malaysian television series debuts
2011 Malaysian television series endings